The Weatherboard Cathedral (1969) is a poetry collection by Australian poet Les Murray. This is the first collection of poems by Murray as the sole author; he had previously published The Ilex Tree in 1965 in collaboration with Geoffrey Lehmann.

The collection consists of 47 poems, some of which were published in various Australian poetry publications, though most appear in print here for the first time. It contains the poet's well-known work "An Absolutely Ordinary Rainbow", which has been reprinted in a number of Australian poetry anthologies since its original publication in 1967.

Contents

Critical reception 
While reviewing the book as a part of a survey of Australian poetry of the time, Ronald Dunlop noted that Murray "is what would have been termed in an age less self-conscious about its literary terminology a poet of the outback. The poetry in his new book, The Weatherboard Cathedral comes directly from his knowledge of and affection for the land and its people. These positive values give his work warmth that could not be achieved by the simple desire to herald the triumph of the good earth over city sin. In his most characteristic poems, ‘Troop Train Returning’, ‘Recourse to the Wilderness’ or ‘The Wilderness’, for example, journeys inland ‘beyond the Divide’ or to ‘the waterless kingdom’ become pilgrimages in search of self and old values."

In his 2010 essay "Art with It's Largesse and Its Own Restraint : The Sacramental Poetics of Elizabeth Jennings and Les Murray", included in the critical anthology Between Human and Divine : The Catholic Vision in Contemporary Literature edited by Mary R. Reichardt, Stephen McInerney opined that "The Weatherboard Cathedral reveals the many-sidedness of Murray's sacramental poetic. As well as depicting a world saturated with God's presence (a dimension of Murray's work that reached its apotheosis in the 1992 collection Translations from the Natural World), it also shows how the sacramental enlarges to embrace the sacrificial aspects of the human and animal kingdoms."

See also
 1969 in Australian literature
 1969 in poetry

References

Australian poetry collections
1969 books
Angus & Robertson books